Visoko pri Poljanah is a settlement in the Municipality of Škofja Loka in the Upper Carniola region of Slovenia.

Name
The name of the settlement was changed from Visoko to Visoko pri Poljanah in 1953. In the past the German name was Wisoko.

Visoko estate

The Visoko estate in the Poljane Valley is part of this settlement. It comprises two large farms, first mentioned in documents as early as the 13th century. The Kalan farm was arranged by the writer and politician Ivan Tavčar into his manor. In his best-known work, The Visoko Chronicles, Tavčar describes events taking place on this estate in the 17th century, when the Kalan family were overlords of the entire valley. There is a bronze statue of the writer by the sculptor Jakob Savinšek close to the manor house. Tavčar is also buried at Visoko.

References

 Škofja Loka municipality site
 Hiking Travel Guide to Slovenia

External links

Visoko at Geopedia

Populated places in the Municipality of Škofja Loka